Hellobike (Chinese: 哈啰出行, lit.: 'Hello travel') is a transportation service platform based in Shanghai, China.  Founded in 2016, the company merged with Youon Bike the following year.

Hellobike first focused on building market share for its bicycle-sharing service in China's second- and third-tier cities, before shifting its focus to China's largest urban regions.  

In recent years, Hellobike has expanded aggressively in the areas of electric scooter and electric bike transportation.  In 2019, Hellobike and Contemporary Amperex Technology Co Ltd announced a US$145 million electric battery joint venture.  This operation aims to develop a network of stations that would enable riders to pick up fully-charged batteries.

In a series of fundraising rounds dating back to 2016, Hellobike has raised over US$1.8 billion from investors.  Ant Group, the company's largest single investor, holds an estimated 36 percent share in Hellobike.

In the highly-competitive Chinese bike sharing market, Hellobike's primary rival is Mobike.

References

External links 
 

Alibaba Group
Transport companies of China
Bicycle sharing companies
Companies based in Shanghai
Online companies of China